Qalyubia Governorate is one of the governorates of Egypt. Located in Lower Egypt. It is situated north of Cairo in the Nile Delta region. Its capital is Banha.

Name
The name of Qalubiyya  governorate is derived from Qalyub city in it. Qalyub is derived from Calliope. Calliope is an ancient Greek goddess,the Muse of epic poetry.

Geography
Banha and several other settlements blend into the neighboring Cairo Governorate; as a result, parts of Qalyubia (particularly Shubra El Kheima) are generally considered to form part of the Greater Cairo metropolitan area (along with Cairo governorate, Giza city and 6 October city).

Municipal divisions
The governorate is divided into the following municipal divisions for administrative purposes, with a total estimated population as of July 2017 of 5,647,716. In some instances there is a markaz and a kism with the same name.

Population
According to population estimates, in 2015 the majority of residents in the governorate lived in rural areas, with an urbanization rate of only 44.7%. Out of an estimated 5,105,972 people residing in the governorate, 2,825,045 people lived in rural areas as opposed to only 2,280,927 in urban areas.

Cities
The cities in the Qalyubia Governorate are:

 Banha
 Khanka
 Qaha
 Qalyub
 Shibin El Qanater
 Shubra El Kheima
 Tukh
 El Qanater El Khayreya
 Kafr Shukr
Obour City
Khusus

Industrial zones
According to the Egyptian Governing Authority for Investment and Free Zones (GAFI), in affiliation with the Ministry of Investment (MOI), the following industrial zones are located in this governorate:
Al Shorouk 
Al Safa 
Al Aqrasha 
 (New urban community) Al Obour industrial zone

Economy
Qalyubia is known for its agricultural production of crops, fruits and vegetables. The most important of these crops include maize, cotton, wheat, citrus fruits, bananas, oranges and apricots. Qalyubia is also the leading Egyptian governorate in the production of poultry and eggs.

Programs and projects
In 1981, the Basic Village Service Program (BVS) had several water projects going on in the Qalyubia Governorate.

In a program that began on August 28, 2012 (through 2018), the European Union invested 40 million Euros on upgrading the infrastructure of informal areas in Qalyubia Governorate.

References

External links
 Qalyubia Governorate on Facebook
 Qalyubia Now Newspaper
 El Wattan News of Qalyubia Governorate

Governorates of Egypt
Nile Delta